Houtzager is a surname. Notable people with the surname include:

Hans Houtzager (1910–1993), Dutch hammer thrower
Marc Houtzager (born 1971), Dutch equestrian

See also
Gijsbertus Houtzagers (1888–1957), Dutch botanist